Yandarlo is a locality in the Blackall-Tambo Region, Queensland, Australia.

Geography 
The Landsborough Highway passes through the locality from the north-west (Tambo) to the south-east (Nive).

References 

Blackall-Tambo Region
Localities in Queensland